Tony Virta (born June 18, 1972) is a Finnish former professional ice hockey forward. He was drafted by the Minnesota Wild as their fourth-round pick in the 2001 NHL Entry Draft.

On December 5, 2005, Virta received a serious knee injury from a failed hip check against him in a game against Ilves, but recovered to play in the last games of the season.

In the summer of 2001 Virta signed with Färjestads BK, but before the season had started he signed with the NHL club Minnesota Wild, who had drafted the same summer, and therefore never played a game for Färjestad.

Awards
 Lasse Oksanen trophy for best player during the SM-liiga regular season - 2001

Career statistics

Regular season and playoffs

International

External links

1972 births
People from Hämeenlinna
Finnish ice hockey right wingers
Frankfurt Lions players
Houston Aeros (1994–2013) players
HPK players
Jokerit players
Färjestad BK players
GCK Lions players
Leksands IF players
Living people
Minnesota Wild draft picks
Minnesota Wild players
Södertälje SK players
HC TPS players
ZSC Lions players
Sportspeople from Kanta-Häme